Claude Jean Jules César Abbes (24 May 1927 – 11 April 2008) was a French professional footballer who played as a goalkeeper.

Career
Abbes played the majority of his professional career for local club Saint-Étienne, where he won the 1957 Première division, the first title ever for the club.
 
He was also part of the France national team squads at the FIFA World Cups of 1954 and 1958, and played four matches at the latter, where France finished in third place.

He died on 11 April 2008.

References

External links
 

1927 births
2008 deaths
Sportspeople from Hérault
French footballers
France international footballers
Association football goalkeepers
AS Béziers Hérault (football) players
AS Saint-Étienne players
Ligue 1 players
1954 FIFA World Cup players
1958 FIFA World Cup players
French football managers
Footballers from Occitania (administrative region)